Phalloides  may refer to:
 Amanita phalloides, the death cap, a poisonous basidiomycete fungus species
 Battarrea phalloides, an inedible mushroom species
 Mitrula phalloides, a synonym for Mitrula paludosa, the swamp beacon or bog beacon, a fungus species